The Kuwait national football team is the national team of Kuwait and is controlled by the Kuwait Football Association. Kuwait made one World Cup finals appearance, in 1982, managing one point in the group stages. In the Asian Cup, Kuwait reached the final in 1976 and won the tournament in 1980.

Kuwait's 20–0 win over Bhutan in 2000 was at the time the biggest ever victory in international football. It was surpassed in 2001, when Australia beat American Samoa 31–0.

While Kuwait was one of Asia's major football force during 1970s to 2000s, the strength of the national team has started to fade slowly from 2010s, with Kuwait failing in two consecutive Asian Cups in 2011 and 2015, before being disqualified for 2019 edition and missing out on 2023 AFC Asian Cup. The team has also failed to reach any World Cup since 1982.

History

Early successes
Kuwait's first international match was played in the 1961 Pan Arab Games against Libya which ended in a 2–2 draw. Kuwait's biggest loss was against the United Arab Republic when they lost 8–0 in the same tournament. Kuwait national football team has joined the World Cup in 1982 which was held in Spain. Kuwait was placed in the fourth group and got the fourth place after defeats to England and France and a respectable draw with Czechoslovakia. Kuwait has won the Asian Cup in 1980 which was held on its soil. Kuwait won the Final 3–0 against South Korea. Kuwait's historical highest FIFA ranking was the 24th place achieved in December 1998. Bader Al-Mutawa is the most capped player of the Kuwaiti team, and Bashar Abdullah is the top goalscorer in the history of the Kuwait national football team. Kuwait has won the Arabian Gulf Cup ten times, and is the most successful team in winning that competition. Kuwait's most historical manager was Luiz Felipe Scolari, who won the World Cup with Brazil, and was forced to leave the country after the 1990 invasion by Iraq. He led Kuwait to win the 1990 Gulf Cup beating Qatar in The Final.

Kuwait's biggest win was against Bhutan which ended in a thrilling 20–0 win, which was the biggest win until Australia won 31–0 against American Samoa in 2001. Kuwait's most successful years were between 1970 and 1990 which had players like Jasem Yaqoub, Faisal Al-Dakhil, and Saad Al-Houti.

Suspensions
On 30 October 2007, Kuwait was suspended by FIFA from all participation in international football, on the grounds of governmental interference in the national football association. The ban lasted less than 2 weeks.
On 24 October 2008, Kuwait was again suspended by FIFA from all participation in international football, because of its failure to hold the General Assembly elections by mid-October.  FIFA provisionally lifted its suspension on the Kuwait Football Association (KFA) on 22 December 2008. By the time, while Kuwait remained a formidable force in the Gulf, it has also declined from Asia's relevance, unable to progress from the group stage of the 2011 and 2015 AFC Asian Cups, the team finished last with no point in both tournaments.

Once again, on 16 October 2015, Kuwait was suspended for the third time as FIFA did not recognize the new sports law in the country. Kuwait tried to get the suspension lifted at the 66th FIFA Congress but this was rejected and therefore from the earlier announcement on 27 April 2016, the hosting of the Gulf Cup tournament would also be moved to Qatar. The suspension was eventually lifted on 6 December 2017, after Kuwait's adoption of a new sports law. By this time, the team had fallen from the 139th place to the 189th place in the FIFA World Rankings due to its inactivity, which also caused the team to miss the qualifiers for the 2018 FIFA World Cup and the 2019 AFC Asian Cup.

On 7 December 2017, it was announced that Kuwait would host the 2017 Gulf Cup tournament after Saudi Arabia, the United Arab Emirates, and Bahrain, all withdrew when the tournament was previously set to be hosted by Qatar because of the Qatari diplomatic crisis, so it was moved to Kuwait to please all withdrawn parties to participate.

Revival
During the 2022 FIFA World Cup qualification, Kuwait, which only started to rebuild its team following years of suspensions and instabilities, was drawn in group B alongside old foes Australia and Jordan, outside minnows Nepal and Chinese Taipei. Although Kuwait has better head-to-head records against Australia in major tournaments, suspensions and inactivities proved detrimental as the team lost 0–3 twice. Still, the qualifiers stood out as the best qualification for Kuwait since 2006, where Kuwait impressed by finishing second, though being unable to progress to the third round.

Team image

Home Stadium
 

The Kuwait National Team has two home stadiums, and they are Jaber Al-Ahmad International Stadium and Al-Sadaqua Walsalam Stadium. Jaber Al-Ahmed International Stadium was built in 2009, and Kuwait celebrated winning the 20th Gulf Cup in that stadium; while Al-Sadaqua Walsalam Stadium is for the Kuwaiti club Kazma SC and was the Kuwait national team home. Following the 2014 FIFA World Cup qualification-AFC Second Round, playing against the Philippines on 23 July 2011, this was the last time Mohammed Al-Hamed Stadium was the Kuwait Home stadium. On 16 May 2012, Kuwait played against the 2011–12 La Liga Champions Real Madrid in Al Kuwait Sports Club Stadium, the home ground of Kuwaiti club Kuwait SC, which Real Madrid won 2–0. Kuwait played their entire 2014 FIFA World Cup qualification-AFC Third Round in Al-Sadaqua Walsalam Stadium, beating the United Arab Emirates 2–1, drawing with South Korea 1–1 and losing to Lebanon 1–0.

Before Jaber Al-Ahmed international stadium was finally built in 2009, Kuwait played in Mohammed Al-Hamed Stadium. When Kuwait hosted the 1980 Asian Cup, the tournament was hosted in Sabah Al-Salem Stadium, which has a capacity of 22,000 spectators and was the largest stadium in Kuwait at that time, and Kuwait won their first and only Asian Cup of all time in that stadium. When Kuwait hosted the 1974 Gulf Cup, it was the first time Kuwait had hosted a Gulf Cup competition, and all the matches were played in Al Kuwait Sports Club Stadium. Kuwait were champions of that competition for the first time in their history on home soil, and the third time in a row overall. In 1990, Kuwait hosted the 1990 Gulf Cup for the second time in their history and were crowned Champions of that competition. All of the games were played on Al-Sadaqua Walsalam Stadium. In the 2003 Gulf Cup, Kuwait hosted the competition for the third time, and once again all the matches were played in one stadium, the Al-Sadaqua Walsalam Stadium. However, Kuwait lost the competition. In the 2017 Gulf Cup, Kuwait hosted the tournament for the fourth time. All the matches were played in two stadiums, the Jaber Al-Ahmad International Stadium and Al Kuwait Sports Club Stadium. However, Kuwait were eliminated from the group stage after losing to Saudi Arabia and Oman and drawing with the United Arab Emirates.

Media coverage
All Kuwait matches are broadcast with full commentary on Kuwait TV Sport. These matches are live and exclusive. beIN Sports broadcast Kuwait matches live and exclusive. So broadcast exclusively on 3 different channels, which is not exclusive. Dubai Sports broadcast Kuwait matches only in special events like the Gulf Cup, Asian Cup and others.

Kit

Kuwaits traditional colors are blue and white: The blue kits are their home ones and the whites for matches away. The blue sea and sky are important in Kuwait because it shows the connection of the people to pearl hunting as well as the spaciousness of the universe. Kuwait's official kit provider is currently the sports company Errea and will be Adidas from 2023 onwards. Kuwait wore the blue shirts in the 1980 AFC Asian Cup and the 1982 FIFA World Cup.

Kit suppliers

Rivalries
Kuwait vs. Iraq
  Iraq national football team

Iraq's rivalry with Kuwait was once considered as the Arab world's greatest football rivalry of all-time. The rivalry began in the mid 1970s and it was the decade from 1976 until 1986 that saw the golden age of football for arguably the finest teams the region has produced. Both nations imposed their complete domination on the Gulf region, and from the Gulf Cup's inception in 1970 until 1990, the tournament was won by only two teams; Kuwait seven times (1970, 1972, 1974, 1976, 1982, 1986, 1990), and despite Iraq's absence in the first three editions and withdrawal in two others, Iraq won it three times (1979, 1984, 1988).

Iraq and Kuwait took their increasingly bitter rivalry to a new level. On 11 June 1976, the two met in the semi-final of the Asian Cup in Tehran; Kuwait took the lead twice, Iraq came roaring back twice, And then, in the 10th minute of extra time, Kamel scored the winner for Kuwait. In 1979, the year Iraq clinched their first Gulf Cup and won over Kuwait 3–1, the two met in a qualifier for the Moscow 1980 Olympic Games, both managed to qualify to the Olympic Games, and both made it to the quarter-finals in Moscow. Iraq also qualified for the 1984 Games in Los Angeles and 1988 Games in Seoul. The 1982 Asian Games was won as well. Kuwait won the 1980 AFC Asian Cup, which they hosted. The nations also left their mark on the world stage. Kuwait qualified for the 1982 World Cup finals in Spain. Iraq matched that in Mexico 1986.

As Iraq and Kuwait traded Gulf titles in 1988 and 1990, few could have imagined that their rivalry on the football field would be replaced by an altogether more catastrophic one on the battlefield. Because of the Gulf war, football would never be the same again. Iraq and Kuwait were in complete avoidance and never met for more than a decade. Kuwait's Blues had a relative recovery of sorts, winning the Gulf Cup in 1996 and 1998, before securing their record 10th title in 2010. Iraqi football, because of Uday Hussein's reign as head of the football association, would take far longer to recover. When it did, it was in glorious fashion, the Lions of Mesopotamia winning the 2007 Asian Cup.

Kuwait vs. Saudi Arabia 
  Saudi Arabia national football team

Results and fixtures

2022

2023

Coaching staff

Coaching history 

 Ali Othman and Majid Mohammed (1955)
 Ahmed Abu Taha (1957)
 Edmund Majowski (1957–1958)
 Ljubiša Broćić (1962)
 Saleh El Wahsh (1964)
 Gyula Grosics (1966)
 Dimitri Tadić (1966–1969)
 Taha El-Doukhi (1970)
 Ljubiša Broćić (1971–1973)
 Hassan Nassir (1973)
 Ljubiša Broćić (1973–1975)
 Mário Zagallo (1976–1978)
 Saleh Zakaria (1978)
 Carlos Alberto Parreira (1978–1982)
 Antônio Lopes (1983–1985)
 Malcolm Allison (1985–1986)
 Saleh Zakaria (1986)
 György Mezey (1986–1987)
 Antônio Vieira (1987–1988)
 George Armstrong (1988)
 Otacílio Gonçalves (1989–1990)
 Luiz Felipe Scolari (1990)
 Mohammed Karam (1990)
 Valmir Louruz (1990–1992)
 Paulo Campos (1992–1993)
 Gildo Rodrigues (1993)
 Jawad Maqseed (1993)
 Valeriy Lobanovskyi (1993–1996)
 Milan Máčala (1996–1999)
 Dušan Uhrin (1999–2001)
 Berti Vogts (2001–2002)
 Radojko Avramović (2002)
 Paulo César Carpegiani (2003–2004)
 Mohammed Ebrahim Hajeyah (2004)
 Slobodan Pavković (2005)
 Mohammed Ebrahim Hajeyah (2005)
 Mihai Stoichiță (2005–2006)
 Saleh Zakaria (2006–2007)
 Rodion Gačanin (2007–2008)
 Mohammed Ebrahim Hajeyah (2008–2009)
 Goran Tufegdžić (2009–2013)
 Jorvan Vieira (2013–2014)
 Nabil Maâloul (2014–2015)
 Boris Bunjak (2017)
 Radojko Avramović (2018)
 Romeo Jozak (2018–2019)
 Thamer Enad (2019–2020)
 Andres Carrasco (2020–2021)
 Thamer Enad (2021)
 Vítězslav Lavička (2022)
 Rui Bento (2022–)

Players

Current squad
The following players were called up for the 25th Arabian Gulf Cup.

 Match date: 7 – 13 January 2023

Caps and goals correct as of 13 January 2023, after the match against the Bahrain.

Recent call-ups
The following players have also been called up to the Kuwait squad within the last 12 months.

Previous squads
World Cup squads
1982 FIFA World Cup squads – Kuwait

Asian Cup squads
1972 AFC Asian Cup squads – Kuwait
1976 AFC Asian Cup squads – Kuwait
1980 AFC Asian Cup squads – Kuwait
1984 AFC Asian Cup squads – Kuwait
1988 AFC Asian Cup squads – Kuwait
1996 AFC Asian Cup squads – Kuwait
2000 AFC Asian Cup squads – Kuwait
2004 AFC Asian Cup squads – Kuwait
2011 AFC Asian Cup squads – Kuwait
2015 AFC Asian Cup squads – Kuwait

Records

Players in bold are still active with Kuwait.

Most appearances

Top goalscorers

Competitive record

FIFA World Cup

AFC Asian Cup

*Denotes draws include knockout matches decided via penalty shoot-out.
**Gold background colour indicates that the tournament was won. Red border colour indicates tournament was held on home soil.

Olympic Games

Asian Games

WAFF Championship

Arabian Gulf Cup

Pan Arab Games

FIFA Arab Cup

Head-to-head record
The following table shows Kuwait's all-time international record,  after match against

Honours

Continental honours
 AFC Asian Cup
Winners (1): 1980
Runners-up (1): 1976
Third place (1): 1984
Fourth place (1): 1996

Regional honours
 FIFA Arab Cup
Third place (3): 1964, 1992, 1998
Fourth place (1): 1963

 Arabian Gulf Cup
Winners (10): 1970, 1972, 1974, 1976, 1982, 1986, 1990, 1996, 1998, 2010
Runners-up (1): 1979
Third place (1): 2013, 2002

 West Asian Games
Winners (1): 2002
Third place (1): 1997

 WAFF Championship
Winners (1): 2010
Fourth place (1): 2014 

 Pan Arab Games
Third place (2): 1992*, 2011
Fourth place (1): 1997

* The 1992 edition organised as part of the Pan Arab Games, and also counted as Arab Cup.

Friendly
 Focus International Cup
Winners (1): 2011

 Merdeka Cup
Runners-up (1): 1973

Notes

References

External links

Official Kuwait Football Site
Official Fans Forum Site

 
AFC Asian Cup-winning countries
Asian national association football teams